This is a list of the leaders of the opposition party of Quebec, Canada since Confederation (1867).

Note that the leader of the Opposition is not always the leader of the political party with the second-largest number of seats, in cases where the leader of that party does not have a seat.

There was no Leader of the Official Opposition until March 1869, when the government's second budget was introduced.

Footnotes

See also
 List of Quebec general elections
 Timeline of Quebec history
 National Assembly of Quebec
 List of Quebec premiers
 List of third party leaders (Quebec)
 History of Quebec

External links
 Les chefs de l'opposition officielle depuis 1869 

Quebec
Official Opposition leaders
Opp
Quebec